Lichesterol is a sterol made by certain fungi and lichens.

References

Sterols
Lichen products